Atlantic Crossing is a historical drama in the form of a television miniseries set in Norway and the United States during World War II.  The series is wide-ranging but pays special attention to interactions between Crown Princess Martha of Norway and President Franklin Roosevelt during the period when Martha was a war refugee in the United States after fleeing the 1940 Nazi Invasion of Norway.

Some portions with Norwegian, Danish or Swedish spoken dialogue are subtitled in English. It premiered on 25 October 2020 on NRK in Norway. The series premiered 4 April 2021 on Masterpiece Theatre on PBS.

Production
The eight part series was co-produced by the Norwegian independent production company Cinenord, Norway’s public broadcaster NRK and the US Public Broadcasting Service (PBS). Most of the series was filmed in the Czech Republic and Norway.

Reception
The series created controversy in Norway by repeatedly portraying the President and the Crown Princess as romantically involved, a claim that is not supported by historical evidence.

Main cast
Sofia Helin as Crown Princess Märtha of Norway
Tobias Santelmann as Crown Prince Olav of Norway
Kyle MacLachlan as Franklin Delano Roosevelt, President of the United States
Søren Pilmark as King Haakon VII of Norway
Anneke von der Lippe as Ragni Østgaard, Crown Princess Märtha's lady-in-waiting

Recurring
 Harriet Sansom Harris as Eleanor Roosevelt, First Lady of the United States 
 Daniel Betts as Harry Hopkins, Roosevelt's closest advisor on foreign policy affairs during the war
 Lucy Russell as Missy LeHand, Roosevelt's private secretary
 Suzanne Bertish as Florence Harriman, U.S. ambassador to Norway
 Leonora Eik as Princess Ragnhild of Norway
 Amathea Eik as Princess Astrid of Norway
 Justýna Brozková as Prince Harald of Norway
 Michael Pitthan as King George VI of the United Kingdom
 Abigail Rice as Queen Elizabeth of the United Kingdom
 Lasse Kolsrud as Nikolai Ramm-Østgaard, Olav's aide-de-camp
 Petr Meissel as Oswald Nordlie, King Haakon's aide-de-camp
 Terje Ranes as Johan Nygaardsvoll, Prime Minister of Norway
 Stig Ryste Amdam as General Carl Gustav Fleischer, commander of the Norwegian infantry brigade based in Scotland
 Trond Teigen as Wilhelm Morgenstierne, Norwegian Ambassador to the United States

Guest
 Erik Hivju as General Otto Ruge, Commander-in-chief of the Royal Norwegian Armed Forces 
 Marianne Høgsbro as Princess Ingeborg, Duchess of Västergötland, Crown Princess Märtha's mother
 Jan Tiselius as Prince Carl, Duke of Västergötland, Crown Princess Märtha's father
 Carl-Magnus Dellow as King Gustaf V of Sweden, Crown Princess Märtha's uncle
 Oscar Töringe as Prince Carl Bernadotte, Crown Princess Märtha's brother
 Fredrik Dolk as Per-Albin Hansson, Prime Minister of Sweden
 Hartmut Krug as Victor Prinz zu Wied, German Ambassador to Sweden
 Fridtjov Såheim as Alfred Isaksen, a double amputee and survivor of the Arctic convoys
 Dan Cade as Private Joseph L. Lockard, a soldier manning the radar station at a hilltop at Opana Point, Oahu
 Stanislav Callas as Private George R. Elliot Jr., Lockard's colleague and fellow radio operator

References

External links
 
 Rabinowitz, Dorothy. 'Atlantic Crossing' Review: Harboring Royals and Passions, wsj, March 31, 2021
 Norwegian Government in Exile 
 "Norway’s crown princess fled the Nazis with her children and lived in Maryland" The Washington Post

Cultural depictions of Eleanor Roosevelt
Cultural depictions of Franklin D. Roosevelt
Masterpiece Theatre
NRK original programming
2020 Norwegian television series debuts
2020 Norwegian television series endings
2020s Norwegian television series
Television shows set in Norway
Television shows set in Washington, D.C.
World War II television series
Television shows set in Finland
Television shows set in London
Television shows set in Stockholm
Television shows filmed in the Czech Republic
Television shows filmed in Norway